The 2015 Hong Kong Community Cup was the 2nd Hong Kong Community Cup, an annual Hong Kong football match played between the winners of the previous season's Premier League and Season Play-offs. The match was contested by Kitchee, the 2014–15 Hong Kong Premier League winners, and South China, champions of the 2014–15 Hong Kong Season Play-off. It was held at Mong Kok Stadium on 20 September 2015.

Match details

See also
2015–16 Hong Kong Premier League

References

Community Cup
Hong Kong Community Cup
Hong Kong Community Cup